Andreas Gounas (born 26 August 1957) is a Greek former water polo player who competed in the 1980 Summer Olympics and in the 1984 Summer Olympics.

References

1957 births
Living people
Greek male water polo players
Olympiacos Water Polo Club players
Olympic water polo players of Greece
Water polo players at the 1980 Summer Olympics
Water polo players at the 1984 Summer Olympics
Water polo players from Piraeus